George Fulke Lyttelton, 2nd Baron Lyttelton (27 October 1763 – 12 November 1828) was an Anglo-Irish peer and politician from the Lyttelton family.

He was the eldest son of William Lyttelton, 1st Baron Lyttelton and his first wife Martha Macartney. Between 1798 and 1800, Lyttelton represented Granard in the Irish House of Commons.

He succeeded his father as member of parliament for Bewdley in 1790; and to his title and his estates in Hagley, Halesowen, and Frankley in 1808.  He died unmarried and was succeeded by his half-brother William Henry Lyttelton, 3rd Baron Lyttelton.

References
Burke's Peerage and Baronetage (1939), s.v Cobham, Viscount

External links

1763 births
1828 deaths
Barons in the Peerage of Great Britain
British MPs 1790–1796
Irish MPs 1798–1800
Members of the Parliament of Great Britain for English constituencies
Members of the Parliament of Ireland (pre-1801) for County Longford constituencies
Westcote of Ballymore, George Lyttelton, 2nd Baron
George